This article lists those who were potential candidates for the Republican nomination for Vice President of the United States in the 1988 election. Incumbent Vice President George H. W. Bush won the 1988 Republican nomination for President of the United States, and chose Indiana Senator Dan Quayle as his running mate. The selection of Quayle surprised many of Bush's closest advisers, who had expected Bush to pick a more well-known running mate. However, Bush adviser Roger Ailes helped convince Bush that Quayle would be able to effectively attack the Democratic presidential nominee, Michael Dukakis. Bush also liked Quayle's youth and felt that Quayle would make for a loyal vice president. The Bush–Quayle ticket ultimately defeated the Dukakis–Bentsen ticket in the 1988 election.

During the selection process, real-estate developer and future U.S. president Donald Trump approached Bush's campaign manager Lee Atwater asking to be considered as a possible choice for running mate. Bush found the request "strange and unbelievable." Contradicting this report, Trump later asserted it was Atwater who approached him asking if he was interested in the position.

Possible running mates

Final candidates

Media speculation on possible running-mates

Members of Congress

Governors

Other Individuals

See also
George H. W. Bush 1988 presidential campaign
1988 Republican Party presidential primaries
1988 Republican National Convention
1988 United States presidential election
List of United States major party presidential tickets
Senator, you're no Jack Kennedy

References

Vice presidency of the United States
1988 United States presidential election
Dan Quayle
George H. W. Bush